Chief Multnomah was an 18th-century Willamette leader in the Columbia River Valley. Though once thought to be a fictional or mythic character, more recent study of Native American oral tradition suggests he was a real individual who held significant power in his prime. He is depicted in Hermon Atkins MacNeil's 1904 sculpture, Coming of the White Man, located in Washington Park in Portland, Oregon.

References

18th-century Native Americans
Native Americans in Oregon